Víctor Hugo Centurión Miranda (born 24 February 1986) is a Paraguayan professional footballer who plays as a goalkeeper.

Career
Víctor Centurión's international debut was in May 2014.

References

External links

1986 births
Living people
Paraguayan footballers
Paraguay international footballers
Paraguayan expatriate footballers
Paraguayan Primera División players
Categoría Primera A players
Club Olimpia footballers
Club Libertad footballers
Club Tacuary footballers
Club Sol de América footballers
Deportivo Cali footballers
Sportivo Iteño footballers
Sportivo Luqueño players
Club Guaraní players
Expatriate footballers in Colombia
Paraguayan expatriate sportspeople in Colombia
Association football goalkeepers